Michael ffolkes (6 June 1925 – 18 October 1988), born Brian Davis, was a British illustrator and cartoonist most famous for his work on the Peter Simple column in The Daily Telegraph. He also worked for Punch and Playboy.

Life
Brian Davis was born in London. He studied art at Saint Martin's School of Art, and in 1942 sold his first drawing to Punch, signing it "brian". He went on to study painting at the Chelsea School of Art and later adopted "Michael ffolkes" as his artistic name, becoming a professional cartoonist in 1949. He typically signed his cartoons as "ffolkes" in an all-lowercase style. In 1955, ffolkes began to illustrate the "Way of the World" column in The Daily Telegraph. In 1961, he began illustrating Punch film reviews, and later its covers.

He contributed to such newspapers and magazines as The Strand Magazine, Lilliput, The Daily Telegraph, The Spectator, The Sunday Telegraph, Playboy, Private Eye, The New Yorker, Reader's Digest, Krokodil, and Esquire. He was a prolific illustrator of children's books, in particular those of Roald Dahl, and published his autobiography, ffundamental ffolkes, in 1985.

According to Ken Pyne, the cartoonist Martin Honeysett "... achieved almost legendary status when he threw a huge wobbly cake baked for Private Eye's 21st birthday party over the head of the notoriously pompous cartoonist Michael ffolkes. His name will live forever just for that."

Death 
He died in London on 18 October 1988 at age 63 from undisclosed causes.

References

Further reading

External links 
  — review of a retrospective of ffolkes' work
 Michael ffolkes at the National Portrait Gallery.

1925 births
1988 deaths
British illustrators
Punch (magazine) cartoonists
Alumni of Saint Martin's School of Art
Artists from London